Heath Ryan (born 2 July 1958) is an Australian equestrian who represented Australia at the 2008 Summer Olympics in Beijing as part of the dressage team.

Born in Sydney, Ryan was Australia's three-day event champion three times, and won every International Grand Prix competition in Australia in 2007.

Record
1990 Melbourne 3 day event: 1st
2002 World Equestrian Games: Team-12th
2005 Del Mar CDI3* Grand Prix: 5th
2008 Beijing Olympics: Team-8th
2008 Werribee CDI-W Grand Prix Kur: 1st
2008 Sydney CCI3*: 1st
2009 Sydney CDI-W Grand Prix: 2nd
2009 Sydney CCI3*: 3rd
2009 Del Mar CDI3* Grand Prix Kur: 2nd

References

 About Heath Ryan

1958 births
Living people
Australian male equestrians
Olympic equestrians of Australia
Equestrians at the 2008 Summer Olympics
21st-century Australian people